Notes of Some Wanderings with the Swami Vivekananda (1913) is an English-language book written by Sister Nivedita. In this book Nivedita has narrated the experiences she had while traveling with Swami Vivekananda in different parts of India.

Background 
Nivedita travelled to India in 1898. Josephine MacLeod, a friend and devotee of Swami Vivekananda, asked him how best she could help him and got the reply to "Love India". In India Nivedita travelled a lot of places in India, including Kashmir, with Swami Vivekananda. In May 1898, she accompanied Swami Vivekananda to the visit of Himalaya including Nainital and Almora.

In this book, Sister Nivedita has narrated the experiences she had while traveling with Swami Vivekananda in different parts of India.

Chapters 
 Foreword
 Chapter I: The Home on the Ganges
 Chapter II: At Naini Tal and Almora
 Chapter III: Morning Talks at Almora
 Chapter IV: On the way to Kathgodam
 Chapter V: On the way to Baramulla
 Chapter VI: The Vale of Kashmir
 Chapter VII: Life at Srinagar
 Chapter VIII: The Temple of Pandrenthan
 Chapter IX: Walks and Talks beside the Jhellum
 Chapter X: The Shrine of Amarnath
 Chapter XI: At Srinagar on the Return Journey
 Chapter XII: The Camp Under The Chennaard
 Concluding words from the editors

References

External links 
 Full book at Archive.org

Indian autobiographies
English-language books
Books by Sister Nivedita
1913 books
Books about Swami Vivekananda
20th-century Indian books